Mikro Souli is a semi-mountainous village (altitude 300 m.) in Serres regional unit of Central Macedonia, Greece, located 60 km southeast of the city of Serres. Since the 2011 local government reform it is a part (municipal unit) of the municipality of Amphipolis. It has a population of 550 inhabitants. Its former name was "Semalto" (probably from the Latin words "semi-" and "altus")

History

Antiquity
A little further west of Mikro Souli, on the hill "Zavarnikia", were revealed traces of an ancient settlement, which was located on the via Egnatia, as presumed by the discovery of a Roman miliarium. On the next hill of "Agia Marina" there was a prehistoric settlement. Thus, taking also into account the ruins of early Christian basilicas, it is concluded that the area of these two hills was continuously inhabited from prehistoric to Byzantine times.

References

Populated places in Serres (regional unit)
Archaeological sites in Macedonia (Greece)